n-Butyl lactate is an industrial chemical and food additive.

Uses
In an industrial context, n-butyl lactate is used as a solvent and as a chemical feedstock. It is used as a dairy-related flavoring agent.

Metabolism
It is metabolized to lactic acid, which is in turn metabolized to n-butanol, n-butyraldehyde, and n-butyric acid.

Safety
n-Butyl lactate reacts with strong acids, strong bases, and oxidizers. It is also flammable. Exposure to dangerous amounts can occur through inhalation, ingestion, skin contact, or eye contact and causes irritation of the affected area, drowsiness, headache, central nervous system depression, nausea, and vomiting. It is approved as a food additive by the US Food and Drug Administration.

References

Lactate esters
Food additives
Butyl compounds